Benjamin Horr House, also known as the Standard Printing Company, is a historic home located at Hannibal, Marion County, Missouri.  It was built about 1855, and is a two-story, vernacular Greek Revival style brick structure. It has a front gable roof with cornice.  It is the earliest surviving building to have been used for education in Hannibal, having once housed a private school run by the family of one of Mark Twain's former schoolteachers.

It was added to the National Register of Historic Places in 1986.

References

Houses on the National Register of Historic Places in Missouri
Greek Revival houses in Missouri
Houses completed in 1855
Houses in Hannibal, Missouri
School buildings on the National Register of Historic Places in Missouri
National Register of Historic Places in Marion County, Missouri